Operation Resolute is the involvement of the Australian Defence Force (ADF) in Australian government efforts to prevent unauthorised entries to sovereign Australian territory. This has mainly taken the  forms of: remote surveillance; air, sea and land patrols by ADF personnel; seizure of "suspected irregular entry vessels", and; locating/assisting people have entered Australia via such a vessel (prior to the apprehension of such people by relevant civilian authorities). Operation Resolute began on 17 July 2006 and consolidated a number of previous ADF operations, including Operation Relex.

Operation Resolute is commanded by the joint civilian-military Maritime Border Command and the ADF contributes Royal Australian Navy ships, Royal Australian Air Force aircraft and patrols from the Australian Army's Regional Force Surveillance Units as required.

Defence personnel and civilians deployed may be eligible for the Australian Operational Service Medal, specifically the Australian Operational Service Medal – Border Protection (AOSM-BP).

Op Resolute
17 July 2006 to 16 July 2006

See also

Operation Sovereign Borders

References
 Operation Resolute, Australian Department of Defence 

Resolute